The Surveying and Mapping Act was assented to by the President of Pakistan in May 2014 after being passed by the  National Assembly in order to regulate geospatial data.

History

In 2012, the Land Surveying and Mapping Bill was proposed to entrust all mapping responsibilities in Pakistan to the Survey of Pakistan. The proposed bill would require all government and private agencies involved in surveying and mapping to register with the Survey of Pakistan; failure to comply would be punished with one year of imprisonment and a fine of up to one million rupees. The Ministry of Defence argued that the mapping activities of unauthorised firms could go unchecked without a law or regulatory authority. The objectives of the proposed bill would be to prevent the unauthorised mapping of sensitive areas (a potential security risk), prevent damage to survey markers, avoid duplication of mapping efforts, and to make the Survey of Pakistan a National Mapping Agency.

The bill was passed by Pakistan's National Assembly in 2014.

Reception
Syed Ali Asjad Naqvi, Research and Training Director at the Center for Economic Research in Pakistan (CERP), expressed bafflement towards the proposed bill, stating that it will hinder ongoing humanitarian efforts which employ mapping. Naqvi added that bills should be proposed by public representatives rather than the military.

See also
Geospatial Information Regulation Bill, 2016 (India)

References

Acts of the Parliament of Pakistan
2014 in Pakistani law
Geographic data and information regulation